Sonia (born 26 August 1977) also known Sonia Bose is an Indian actress, who works in Tamil and Malayalam films and serials. She debuted, at the age of three, as a child artist in the Malayalam film Ival Oru Naadodi. She continued to appear in many films as a child actor, credited as Baby Sonia. During her childhood she lent her voice for many child artists mainly for Baby Shalini. She got Kerala State Film Award for Best Child artist for the movie Nombarathi Poovu in 1987. She acts in Tamil, Kannada, Telugu movies as well. Her brother Tinku is an actor in Tamil movies.

Personal life

She hails from Tamil Nadu. She married Tamil actor Bose Venkat in 2003. The couple have a son, Tejasvin and a daughter, Bavatharani

Awards

 1984 National Film Award for Best Child Artist - My Dear Kuttichathan
 1987 Kerala State Film Award for Best Female Child Artist  - Nombarathi Poovu

Filmography

Malayalam

 Nazeerinte Rosy
  Zebra Varakal (2017) 
  Crayons (2016) as Soni
  Ellam Chettante Ishtam Pole (2015) as Ganga Devi
  Teens (2013) 
  Housefull (2013) 
  Mullassery Madhavan Kutty Nemom P. O. (2012) as Anupama
  Sarkar Colony (2011) as Thresiamma 
  Sandwich (2011) as Andipetti Nayiker's wife 
  Vellaripravinte Changathi (2011) as Preman's wife 
  Raama Raavanan (2010) as Bhama
  Puthumukhangal (2010) as Thankamani 
  Njaan Sanchaari (2010)
  Nizhal (2010)
  Therukoothu (2009) 
  Sound of Boot (2008) as Bhadra
  Swarnam (2008) as Sugandhi
  Roudram (2008) as Nirmala
  Achante Kochumolku (2003)
  Kattuchembakam (2002) as Paaru
  Bamboo boys (2002)
  Aparanmaar Nagarathil (2001) as Anju & Manju(Double role)
  Mister Butler (2000) as Gopalakrishnan's first wife
  Mattupetti Machan (1998) as Chenthamara
  Guru (1997) as King Vijayanta' wife
  My Dear Kuttichathan 2 (1997) as Lakshmi
  Aksharam (1995) as Bindu Balakrishnan
  The King (1995) as Alex's sister
  Kusrutikattu (1995) as Monica
  King Solomon (1995) as Seethamma
  Minnaminuginum Minnukettu (1995) as Sathi
  Avan Ananthapadmanaabhan (1994) as Manju
  Thenmavin Kombath (1994) as Kuyilu
  Sainyam (1994) as Pathuma
  Ghazal (1993) as Aasiya
  Uppukandam Brothers (1993) as Annie
  Venkalam (1993) as Sulochana
  Addeham Enna Iddeham (1993) as Annie
  Midhya (1990) as Ammini
  Manu Uncle (1988) as Renu
  Daisy- 1988
  Ithrayum Kaalam (1987) as Young Savithri
  Thaniyavarthanam (1987) as Anitha M. Balagopalan (Manikutty)
  Nombarathi Poovu (1987) as Gigi
  Vartha (1986) as Young Radha
 Ariyaatha Bandham (1986)
  Swanthamevide Bandhamevide (1984)
  My Dear Kuttichathan (1984) as Laxmi
  Ivide Ingane (1984)
  Radhayude Kamukan (1984)
  Karimbu (1984) as Painkili
  Asuran (1983)
  Aroodam (1983) as Paru
  Yudham (1983)
  Veedu (1983)
  Iniyenkilum (1983)
  Enthino Pookunna Pookal (1982)
  Ee Nadu (1982)
  Innalenkil Nale (1982)
  Anthiveyilile Ponnu (1982) as Hari's daughter
  Raktham (1981) as Minimol
  Esthappan (1980)
  Theekkadal (1980)
  Moorkhan (1980) as Young Rajani
  Ival Oru Naadody (1979)
  Manoratham (1978)
  Swarna Medal (1977)

Tamil

 Vennila Kabaddi Kuzhu 2 (2019) as Malar's mother
 Veera (2018) as Rajendran's wife
 Theeran Adhigaaram Ondru (2017) as Sathya's wife
 Gemini Ganeshanum Suruli Raajanum (2017) as Gemini's mother
 Manal Kayiru 2 (2016) as TV Host
 Kodi (2016)
 Velainu Vandhutta Vellaikaaran (2016) as Sengamalam
 Massu Engira Masilamani (2015) as Dr. Gnanaprakasham's wife
 Eetti (2015) as Pughazh's mother
 Sakalakala Vallavan (2015) as Thangam
 Soan papdi (2015)
 Uthamaputhiran (2010) as Lalitha (Lallu)
 Chutti Chathan (2010) as Lakshmi
 Thalai Nagaram (2006) as Balu's wife
 Parthiban Kanavu (2003) as Kuyili
 Namma Veetu Kalyanam (2002) as Kannamma
 Shree (2002) as Velayudham's wife
 Style (2002) as Anjamma
 University (2002) as Gouri
 Kanna Unnai Thedukiren (2001) as Bhuvana
 Veettoda Mappillai (2001) as Mohana 
 Vaanchinathan (2001) as Revathi Varadharajan
 Karuvelam Pookkal (2000) as Dhanalakshmi
 Veerapandi Kottayile (1997) as Jaya
 Sishya (1997) as Anu
 Ilaignar Ani (1994) as Janani
 Mouna Mozhi (1992) as Rukku
 Thangamana Thangachi (1991) as Geetha
 Azhagan (1991) Kanmani's Sister
 Pulan Visaranai (1990) as Nimmy /Died Dolly
 Meenakshi Thiruvilayadal (1989) as Kokila
 Mappillai (1989)
 Raja Mariyadhai (1987)
 Poo Poova Poothirukku (1987) as Latha
 Nalla Pambu (1987) 
 Maragatha Veenai (1986)
 Mouna Ragam (1986) as Divya's sister
 Annai Bhoomi 3D (1985)
 En Selvame (1985)
 Viswanathan Velai Venum (1985) as Julie
 Anbulla Rajinikanth (1984)

Hindi
 Ravan Raaj: A True Story (1995) as  Dolly (Twins Appearance) / Roli

Telugu
 Padmavathi Kalyanam (1990)
 Indra Bhavanam (1991)

Kannada
 Namma Bhoomi (1989)

Television serials

TV Shows
 Rani Maharani as Participant
 Genes (season 3) as Participant
 Ruchibhedham as Presenter
 My G Flowers Oru Kodi as Participant

As a playback singer
 Oru Madapravinte Katha (1983) ... Muththe va va

As a dubbing artist
 Ente Mamattukkuttiyammakku (1983) for Baby Shalini
 Sandarbham (1984) for Baby Shalini
 Chakkarayumma (1984) for Baby Shalini
 Chutti Chathan [Tamil Dubbed Version] (1984) for Herself
 Akkacheyude Kunjuvava (1985) for Baby Shalini
 Oru Nokku Kanan (1985) for Baby Shalini
 Parayanumvayya Parayathirikkanumvayya (1985) for Baby Shalini
 Onnu Muthal Poojyam Vare(1986) for Geethu Mohandas
 for Baby Chaithanya
 for Tinku
 Kannamma (2005) for Vindhya

References

External links

 Sonia at MSI

Actresses in Malayalam cinema
Kerala State Film Award winners
Actresses from Tamil Nadu
Indian film actresses
Actresses in Tamil cinema
1977 births
Living people
Actresses in Malayalam television
Indian television actresses
Indian women playback singers
Malayalam playback singers
Indian voice actresses
Actresses in Tamil television
Actresses in Kannada cinema
20th-century Indian actresses
21st-century Indian actresses
Best Child Artist National Film Award winners
21st-century Indian women singers
21st-century Indian singers